Eagle Lake is the first, largest, and deepest lake of the Allagash Wilderness Waterway in the North Maine Woods. The lake covers the eastern side of Eagle Lake township. The southern end of the lake extends into Maine township 7, range 12, where it receives overflow from Indian Pond, and into Soper Mountain township where it receives overflow from Haymock Lake via Smith Brook. Other ponds in the Eagle Lake watershed include Woodman Pond via Woodman Brook, Pillsbury Pond and Little Pillsbury Pond via Smith Brook, Soper Pond and Upper Soper Pond via Soper Brook, and the Russell Ponds via Russell Brook. Eagle Lake originally received overflow from Chamberlain Lake, but Lock Dam has diverted most Chamberlain Lake overflow through Telos Cut to the Penobscot River since the 1850s.

Churchill Lake Dam
A dam in Maine township 10, range 12, has raised the level of Churchill Lake from the adjoining range 12 township 9 into the north end of Eagle Lake in adjoining range 13 of township 9. The dam controls elevation of Eagle Lake by releases to the Allagash River tributary of the Saint John River. Personnel at Churchill Depot control dam releases to sustain Allagash River summer flows favorable for canoe passage of the Allagash Wilderness Waterway.

Fish habitat
The Maine Department of Inland Fisheries and Wildlife considers Eagle Lake ideal habitat for togue, squaretail, cusk, and lake whitefish; and has endeavored to protect the lake from introduction of competing species like yellow perch. Releases from Churchill Lake Dam may be reduced during autumn and winter months to sustain water levels covering rocky shoals used for spawning.

Sources

Lakes of Piscataquis County, Maine
Allagash River
North Maine Woods
Reservoirs in Maine